Perthshire, officially the County of Perth, is a historic county and registration county in central Scotland. Geographically it extends from Strathmore in the east, to the Pass of Drumochter in the north, Rannoch Moor and Ben Lui in the west, and Aberfoyle in the south; it borders the counties of Inverness-shire and Aberdeenshire to the north, Angus to the east, Fife, Kinross-shire, Clackmannanshire, Stirlingshire and Dunbartonshire to the south and Argyllshire to the west. It was a local government county from 1890 to 1930.

Perthshire is known as the "big county", or "the Shire", due to its roundness and status as the fourth largest historic county in Scotland. It has a wide variety of landscapes, from the rich agricultural straths in the east, to the high mountains of the southern Highlands.

Administrative history

Perthshire was an administrative county between 1890 and 1975, governed by a county council. Initially, Perthshire County Council was based in the south wing of Perth Sheriff Court. However, from 1930 onwards, a joint local government council was formed with the small neighbouring county of Kinross-shire, linking the two. Perth County Council was subsequently based at the County Offices in York Place, Perth.

In 1975, the administrative county was superseded by the Local Government (Scotland) Act 1973 and split between the Central and Tayside Regions:

West Perthshire (the area west and south of Killin including Callander, Crianlarich and Aberfoyle) was included in the Stirling District of the Central Region.
The parish of Muckhart and Glendevon was made part of Clackmannan District Council, also in the Central Region.
Longforgan was included in the City of Dundee District, in the Tayside Region.
The remainder of Perthshire was combined with Kinross-shire and the Angus parish of Kettins to form the Perth and Kinross District Council in Tayside.

The two-tier system introduced in 1975 was superseded by a system of unitary authorities in 1996. The districts of Tayside and Central Scotland all became unitary authorities, with Longforgan being transferred from Dundee to Perth and Kinross. The majority of historic Perthshire lies in Perth and Kinross. The exceptions are the southwestern part that is now in the Stirling council area and a few parishes that are now in Clackmannanshire. Perth and Kinross also contains some areas that were not historically in Perthshire, such as Kinross-shire. The lieutenancy areas in the same area are mostly coterminous with the council areas. Perthshire still exists as a registration county.

Boundaries
Prior to the 1890s Perthshire's boundaries were irregular: the parishes of Culross and Tulliallan formed an exclave some miles away from the rest of the county, on the boundaries of Clackmannanshire and Fife; while the northern part of the parish of Logie formed an enclave of Stirlingshire within the county.

Following the recommendations of the council boundary commission appointed under the Local Government (Scotland) Act 1889, Culross and Tulliallan were transferred to Fife, and the entire parish of Logie was included in Stirlingshire.

Coat of arms
The coat of arms of the County of Perth appears to have been granted for use on the colours and standards of the volunteer and militia units of the county raised at the end of the eighteenth century. The Earl of Kinnoull, a native of Perthshire, and commanding officer of the Perthshire Gentlemen and Yeomanry Cavalry, was also Lord Lyon King of Arms at the time, and he presented the arms to the county in 1800. The grant document was discovered in the Lyon Office in 1890, and forwarded to the newly formed Perth County Council.

The shield is very similar to the Scottish royal arms, reflecting that Perthshire was the home county of the House of Dunkeld and contains the former royal capital, Scone. Further royal references are made on the canton, which shows Scone Palace surmounted by the Crown of Scotland. The crest is a Highland soldier, reflecting that the famous Black Watch were formed in the county. The supporters are an eagle and a warhorse, the former from the arms of the city of Perth.

Burghs
By the 1890s the county contained the following burghs, which were largely outside the county council's jurisdiction:

Royal Burgh of Perth (which was styled a city)
Burgh of Auchterarder (formed 1894: reinstated as a royal burgh in 1951)
Burgh of Aberfeldy (police burgh from 1887)
Burgh of Abernethy (burgh of barony from 1458/9, police burgh from 1877)
Burgh of Alyth (burgh of barony from 1488, police burgh from 1834)
Burgh of Blairgowrie (burgh of barony 1634, police burgh 1833)
Burgh of Rattray (police burgh 1873)
Burgh of Callander (police burgh 1866)
Burgh of Coupar Angus (burgh of barony 1607, police burgh 1852)
Burgh of Crieff (burgh of barony 1674, burgh of regality 1687, police burgh 1864)
Burgh of Doune (burgh of barony 1611, police burgh 1890)
Burgh of Dunblane (burgh of regality of the Bishop of Dunblane 1442, police burgh 1870)

The Local Government (Scotland) Act 1929 divided burghs into two classes from 1930: large burghs, which were to gain extra powers from the county council, and small burghs which lost many of their responsibilities.

Of the twelve burghs in Perthshire, only Perth was made a large burgh. There were ten small burghs: Blairgowrie and Rattray being united into a single burgh. In 1947 Pitlochry was created a small burgh.

Civil parishes

In 1894 parish councils were established for the civil parishes, replacing the previous parochial boards. 
The parish councils were in turn replaced by district councils in 1930.

Following the boundary changes caused by the Local Government (Scotland) Act 1889, the county contained the following civil parishes:

Aberdaugie
Aberfeldy
Aberfoyle
Abernethy
Abernyte
Alyth
Ardoch
Arngask
Auchterarder
Auchtergaven Moneydie
Balquhidder
Bankfoot
Bendochy
Blackford
Blair Atholl
Blairgowrie and Rattray
Blairmacgregor
Callander
Caputh
Cargill
Clunie
Collace
Comrie
Coupar Angus
Crieff
Dowally
Dron
Dull
Dunbarney
Dunblane and Lecropt
Dunkeld and Dowally
Dunning
Errol
Findo Gask
Forgandenny
Forteviot
Fortingall
Foss or Fossoway or Crook of Devon
Fowlis Easter
Fowlis Wester
Glendevon
Glen Shee
Inchture
Innerwick
Killin
Kilmadock
Kilspindie
Kincardine
Kinclaven
Kinfauns Kinfauns Castle
Kinloch
Kinnaird, Gowrie
Kinnoull
Kirkmichael
Lethendy
Little Dunkeld
Logiealmond
Logierait
Longforgan
Madderty
Meigle
Methven
Moneydie and Auchtergaven
Monzie or *Monzievaird and Strowan
Moulin
Muckhart
Muthill
Persie
Perth
Port of Menteith
Blairgowrie and Rattray
Redgorton
Rhynd
St Madoes
St Martins
Scone
Stanley
Strathfillian
Strathloch
Tenandry
Tibbermore
Trinity Gask
Tullybelton
Weem

Districts
In 1930 the landward area of the Local Government councils (the part outside of burgh boundaries) was divided into five districts, replacing the parish councils established in 1894:
Central District
Eastern District
Highland District
Perth District
Western District

Geography

The county forms part of the Highland geographic area; it consists of predominantly mountainous and hilly land within the Grampian Mountains, interspersed with numerous lochs and glens. The highest point is Ben Lawers at 1,214 m (3,983 ft), making it the 4th highest peak in Scotland. Most towns are fairly small, with the larger ones being clustered in the flatter south-east of the county. In the far south along the borders with Clackmannanshhire and Kinross-shire lie the Ochil Hills, and in the south-east part of the Sidlaw Hills lie within the county, continuing on into Angus. Perthshire borders the Firth of Tay in the south-east, which provides access to the North Sea; along the north shore lies the Carse of Gowrie, an extremely flat area of land given over to agriculture. Within the Forth can be found the small island of Mugdrum.

Rivers
River Ardle
River Earn
River Ericht
River Farg
River Forth
River Garry
River Isla
River Tay
River Teith
River Tummel

Lochs and Reservoirs

Cally Loch
Carsebreck Loch
Castlehill Reservoir
Cocksburn Reservoir (shared with Stirlingshire)
Dowally Loch
Drumore Loch
Dubh Lochan
Dupplin Loch
Fingask Loch
Glas Finglas Reservoir
Glenfarg Reservoir (shared with Kinross-shire)
Glenquey Resrvoir
Glensherup Reservoir
Laird's Loch
Lake of Menteith
Little Loch Skiach
Loch Achray
Loch an Daimh
Loch an Duin
Loch Ard
Loch Beanie
Loch Benachally
Loch Bollachan
Loch Broom
Loch Chon
Loch Con
Loch Crannach
Loch Creagh
Loch Curran
Loch Derculich
Loch Dhu
Loch Doine
Loch Drunkie
Loch Earn
Loch Eigeach
Loch Ericht (shared with Inverness-shire)
Loch Errochty
Loch Essan
Loch Farleyer
Loch Fender
Loch Finnart
Loch Freuchie
Loch Garry
Loch Glassie
Loch Hoil
Loch Iubhair
Loch Katrine (shared with Dunbartonshire)
Loch Kennard
Loch Kinardochy
Loch Laddon (shared with Argyllshire)
Loch Laggan
Loch Lednock Reservoir
Loch Loch
Loch Lubnaig
Loch Lyon
Loch Macanrie
Loch Maragan
Loch Mhairc
Loch Monaghan
Loch Monzievaird
Loch na Bà
Loch na Brae
Loch nan Eun
Loch of Belloch
Loch of Butterstone
Loch of Clunie
Loch of Craiglush
Loch of Drumellie
Loch of Lowes
Loch Ordie
Loch Oss
Loch Rannoch
Loch Rusky
Loch Scoly
Loch Skiach
Loch Tay
Loch Tilt
Loch Tinker
Loch Tummel
Loch Turret Reservoir
Loch Valigan
Loch Venachar
Loch Voil
Loch Watston
Lochan a' Chait
Lochan a' Mhàidseir
Loch Balloch
Lochan Caol Fada
Lochan Coire na Mèinne
Lochan Creag a' Mhadaidh
Lochan Ghiubhais
Lochan Lairig Laoigh
Lochan Lòin nan Donnlaich
Lochan Mhàim nan Carn
Lochan Mon' an Fhiadhain
Lochan na Beinne
Lochan na Làirige
Lochan nam Breac
Lohan nan Cat
Lochan Oisinneach
Lochan Oisinneach Mòr
Lochan Ruighe nan-Sligean
Lochan Spling
Lochan Sròn Smeur
Lochan Uaine
Lossburn Reservoir
Lower Glendevon Reservoir
Lower Rhynd
Methven Loch
Mill Dam
Monk Myre
Pitcairnie Loch
Pitcarmick Loch
Pond of Drummond
Rae Loch
Redmyre Loch
Rotmell Loch
Seamaw Loch
Stronuich Reservoir
Stormont Loch
Upper Glendevon Reservoir (shared with Clackmannanshire)
Upper Rhynd
Waltersmuir Reservoir
White Loch
White Moss Loch

Mountains

Ben Lawers
Ben Vorlich
Ben Mhor
Ben Vrackie
Beinn a' Ghlò
Schiehallion

Glens and straths

Glen Almond
Glen Isla
Glen Shee
Glen Garry
Glen Tilt
Glen Bruar
Glen Fincastle
Glen Errochty
Glen Rannoch
Glen Lyon
Glen Lochay
Glen Dochart
Strathmore
Strath Ardle
Strath Braan
Strath Tay
Strath Tummel
Strath Fillan
Strath Earn

Settlements

Aberargie
Aberdalgie
Aberfeldy
Aberfoyle
Abermyte
Abernethy
Abernyte
Aberuthven
Achalader
Achnafauld
Acharn
Airntully
Aldclune
Almondbank
Alyth
Amulree
Ardeonaig
Ardler
Ardtalnaig
Auchterarder
Balbeggie
Ballinluig
Balquhidder
Bankfoot
Blackford
Blair Atholl
Blairgowrie
Braco
Bridge of Balgie
Bridge of Earn
Bridge of Tilt
Burrelton
Callander
Cambuskenneth
Campmuir
Caputh
Carpow
Clunie
Collace
Cottown
Coupar Angus
Crianlarich
Dunkeld and Birnam
Comrie
Craigie
Crieff
Dalguise
Deanston
Doune
Dowally
Dull
Dunblane
Dunkeld
Dunning
Edradynate
Errol
Fearnan
Findo Gask
Finegand
Forgandenny
Forteviot
Fortingall
Fowlis Easter
Fowlis Wester
Gartmore
Glencarse
Grandtully
Grange
Greenloaning
Guildtown
Harrietfield
Huntingtower and Ruthvenfield
Inchture
Inchyra
Inveraman
Invergowrie
Invermay
Kenmore
Kettins
Killicrankie
Killin
Kilspindie
Kinloch, Blairgowrie
Kinloch, Coupar Angus
Kinlochard
Kinloch Rannoch
Kinnaird, Atholl
Kinnaird, Gowrie
Kinorssie
Kirkmichael
Kirkton
Lawers
Leetown
Lochearnhead
Logierait
Longforgan
Luncarty
Madderty
Meigle
Meikleour
Methven
Moneydie
Monzievaird
Murthly
Muthill
Old Blair
Perth
Piperdam
Pitcairngreen
Pitkeathly Wells
Pitlochry
Pool of Muckhart
Powmill
Rait
Rattray
Redgorton
Rhynd
St Fillans
St Madoes
Scone
Spittal of Glenshee
Spittalfield
Stanley
Strathtay
Strathyre
Thornhill
Tibbermore
Tullibardine
Tyndrum
Waterloo
Weem
Wolfhill
Woodside

Transport

The Highland Main Line railway line connects Perth to Inverness, and in the far west the West Highland Line criss-crosses the Perthshire-Argyllshire boundary. Other lines in the south-east link Perth to the towns of Fife and Stirlingshire.

Parliamentary constituencies
Following the Act of Union, Perthshire returned members to the House of Commons of the Parliament of the United Kingdom from 1708.

1707–1885
The Royal Burgh of Perth originally formed part of the Perth burghs constituency along with burghs in Fife and Forfarshire. The Representation of the People (Scotland) Act 1832 made Perth a separate burgh constituency.
The remainder of the county returned a single member as the parliamentary county of Perthshire. The parishes of Tulliallan, Culross, Muckhart, and the Perthshire portions of the parishes of Logie and Fossaway were annexed to constituency of Clackmannanshire and Kinross in 1832.

1885–1918
In 1885 seats in the House of Commons were redistributed: Perthshire received three seats.
Perth remained a burgh constituency.
Perthshire Eastern
Perthshire Western

1918–1975
In 1918 there was a further redistribution. Perthshire was combined with Kinross-shire to form a parliamentary county, divided into two constituencies:

Perth constituency consisted of the burgh of Perth, the former Eastern constituency and part of the Western constituency. In 1950 it was renamed Perth and East Perthshire. The area included in the constituency was defined in 1948 and 1970 as the burghs of Perth, Abernethy, Alyth, Blairgowrie and Rattray and Coupar Angus; and the Eastern and Perth districts of the county of Perth.
Kinross and Western Perthshire: the constituency consisted of the entire County of Kinross, the burghs of Aberfeldy, Auchterarder, Callander, Crieff, Doune, Dunblane and Pitlochry; and the Central, Highland and Western districts of the county of Perth.

These boundaries continued in use until 1983, when new constituencies were formed based on the Local Government regions and districts created in 1975.

1975–2005 
Perthshire was represented in House of Commons of the United Kingdom from 1975 to 2005.

2005–present 
Perthshire has two constituencies and two Members of Parliament.

 Ochil and South Perthshire
 Perth and North Perthshire

Famous places

Ashintully Castle
Balvaird Castle
Birnam Wood and Dunsinane Hill, famous from Shakespeare’s Macbeth
Blair Castle
Cateran Trail
Dirnanean House
Drummond Castle
Dunkeld Cathedral
Edradour Distillery
Gleneagles Hotel
The Hermitage
Kindrogan House
Scone Palace
Near Strathtay and Strathmore, where many four-poster stone formations can be found

Notable people

 Archbishop Patrick Adamson
 Duke of Atholl
 James Bannerman
 Anne Fraser Bon
 Edward Braddock
 Sir Archibald Campbell, 1st Baronet
 Baron Cameron of Balhousie
 James Croll
 Alan Cumming
 Sir Charles Douglas
 David Douglas
 Daniel Dow
 Duleep Singh
 Alexander Duff
 Thomas Duncan
 Adam Ferguson
 William Flockhart
 Duncan Forbes
 Niel Gow
 James Graham, 1st Marquess of Montrose
 Thomas Graham, 1st Baron Lynedoch
 Stephen Hendry
 Lady of Lawers
 Alexander Leslie, 1st Earl of Leven
 Alexander Mackenzie
 Dougie MacLean
 John James Rickard Macleod
 Ewan McGregor
 Sir Charles Menzies
 Lord George Murray
 Sir George Murray
 Baron Reid
 J.K. Rowling
 James Small
 Major-General John Small
 William Small
 Rory Stewart
 Magdalene Stirling
 Robert Stirling
 George Thompson, recipient of the Victoria Cross
 John Sen Inches Thomson
 Dr William Marshall

Schools

Ardvreck School
The Community School of Auchterarder
Blairgowrie High School
Breadalbane Academy
Craigclowan Preparatory School
Dollar Academy
Glenalmond College
Inch view primary and nursery school
Kilgraston School
Morrison's Academy
Perth Academy
Perth Grammar School
Perth High School
Pitlochry High School
Rattray Primary School
Strathallan School
Strathearn Community Campus

See also

Earl of Perth
Glasgow Perthshire Charitable Society
Highland Perthshire
Perthshire Rugby Football Club
Perth and Kinross
Scottish Highlands
Stirling
Trossachs
List of counties of Scotland 1890–1975

References

External links
“Perthshire” from A Topographical Dictionary of Scotland by Samuel Lewis, London, 1846 (British History Online)
Perth & Kinross Council
A Vision of Britain Through Time: A vision of Perth and Kinross

Counties of Scotland
Counties of the United Kingdom (1801–1922)